This is a chronological list of notable cases decided by the Senior Courts of England and Wales – that is, cases from the High Court of Justice of England and Wales, Court of Appeal of England and Wales, and Crown Court.

pre-1800 
 Haxey's case (1397) Rot. Parl. (iii) 434
Case of the Thorns (1466) YB 6 Ed 4, 7a pl 18. Early precedent for negligence and trespass to land. 
R v Earl of Northumberland (1568) Crown right to minerals precedent.
 Case of the Swans (1592) Crown right to wildlife precedent
Mouse's case(1602) precedent establishing the defense of Necessity on Tort  
 Booty v Barnaby (1687)

1800–1899 
  
 Vaughn v. Menlove (1837). 132 E.R. 490 (C.P.)
 Foss v Harbottle (1843) 2 Hare 461, 67 ER 189
 
 
 
 Parker v. South Eastern Railway Company (1877), L.R. 2 C.P.D. 416
 Cundy v Lindsay (1878) 3 App Cas 459 
 Household Fire & Carriage Account Insurance Co. Ltd. v. Grant (1879), 4 Exch. Div. 216
 R v. Dudley and Stephens (1884) 14 King's Bench Division 273
 The Moorcock (1889), 14 Probate Division 64
 Kenrick v. Lawrence [1890] QBD 
 Henthorn v. Fraser [1892] 2 Ch. 27
 
 Hollingrake v. Truswell [1894] 3 Ch. 420
 Wilkinson v Downton [1897] 2 Q.B. 57: Intentional infliction of nervous shock
Simcoe v. Pethick, 2 Q.B. 55(1898).   widely cited as an important precedent for public land rights in England.

1900–1999 
 Automatic Self-Cleansing Filter Syndicate Co Ltd v Cuninghame, [1906] 2 Ch. 34 (C.A.): duty of corporate directors
 University of London Press, Ltd. v. University Tutorial Press, Ltd. [1916] 2 Ch. 601
 Balfour v. Balfour [1919] 2 K.B. 571
 
 Foley v. Classique Coaches Ltd. [1934] 2 K.B. 1
 Young v Bristol Aeroplane Co Ltd [1944] KB 718
 
 Central London Property Trust Ltd v High Trees House Ltd [1947] K.B. 130.
 Olley v Marlborough Court Hotel [1949] 1 K.B. 532.
 Shanklin Pier Ltd v Detel Products Ltd, [1951] 2 KB 854
 
 
 Fisher v Bell [1960] 3 W.L.R. 919
 
 R v Waterfield, [1963] 3 All E.R. 659
 Edwards v. Skyways Ltd. [1964] 1 All E.R. 494
 
 Gould v. Gould [1969] 3 All E.R. 728

2000 – present 
 R v Grillo and Grillo

See also 
 List of cases involving Lord Denning
 List of Judicial Committee of the Privy Council cases 
 List of House of Lords cases

Case law lists by court
 
United Kingdom law-related lists
Senior Courts of England and Wales